Die Gstettensaga: The Rise of Echsenfriedl (The Gstetten Saga: The Rise of Echsenfriedl) is a 2014 Austrian science fiction and fantasy film directed by Johannes Grenzfurthner and starring Sophia Grabner, Lukas Tagwerker and Jeff Ricketts.
The absurdist comedy deals with the politics and hype behind media technology and nerd culture. Grenzfurthner calls his film a contemporary way to talk about the critique of the spectacle and commodity fetishism. The film was co-produced by art group monochrom and the media collective Traum & Wahnsinn, and created for the Austrian television channel ORF III. It features music by Kasson Crooker, Starpause, and many others.

Plot
The growing tension between the last two remaining superpowers - China and Google - escalates in the early 21st century, and results in the global inferno of the "Google Wars". But as the decades go by, radioactive dust settles on old battlegrounds, and a New World rises from the ashes of the old.

Fratt Aigner, a seedy journalist, and Alalia Grundschober, a nerdy technician, live and work in Mega City Schwechat: the biggest semi-urban sprawl in the foothills of what remained of the Alps. Thurnher von Pjölk, who invented the printing press and runs the only newspaper around, feels threatened by the rise of a new generation of tech-savvy DIY nerds, who he fears will ruin his monopoly. He gives Alalia and Fratt the task to venture into the depths of Niederpröll and conduct a tele-o-vision interview with Echsenfriedl; a mythical genius that has a large fan base among the nerds.

Pjölk sends off Alalia and Fratt equipped with a broadcasting vehicle (a wheelbarrow full of recording equipment) to live broadcast the interview with Echsenfriedl on tele-o-vision. Fratt is very skeptical of leaving the safety of the Mega City, but Alalia is a huge fan of Echsenfriedl and has investigated into his hiding place on earlier occasions. She sees this as a golden opportunity to find Echsenfriedl and boost her agenda of social change through technology.

The road to finding Echsenfriedl is not an easy task and things start to go wrong as soon as they reach the border, which is protected by the Postal Service, who try to uphold civilization and fight structurelessness. The Postal Service confiscates their recording equipment and send Alalia and Fratt away in despair. They are abducted by a group of barbarians: descendants of farmers, in a cargo cult based on relics of office material, bureaucracy and vague memories of European Union agricultural grants. Alalia and Fratt have to blast their way out and manage to escape before they end up as a sacrifice.

Aliana and Fratt wander the post-nuclear boondocks until they stumble upon a mining colony. They find shelter in a seemingly-abandoned underground structure, but discover a wondrous old lady, Philine-Codec Comtesse de Cybersdorf, who used to be married to Pjölk until he tried to kill her in a rage, which ends in her losing a leg. She tells Aliana and Fratt that it was actually Echsenfriedl who was the re-inventor of the printing press, and he the creative brain behind Pjölk's ideas and thoughts. Pjölk was the man in public only because it was impossible for Echsenfriedl. The Comtesse is about to tell them crucial information about Echsenfriedl, but then cannibalizing undead striking miners invade the room and kill her before she gets the chance to reveal the truth.

Having managed to escape the working-class zombie miners, they encounter the bearded libertarian drag queen Heinz Rand of Raiká, who leads a group of tinsel-dressed free market enthusiasts living on trading useless pre-war electronics for more useless pre-war electronics. Alalia sees that Heinz has the equipment that the Postal Service took from them and she trades it back by helping the group to get their useless electronics working again. Having helped out Heinz, he then tells them where to find Echsenfriedl and even offers his daughter Ayn as a guide to the location.

Alalia and Fratt, with the guidance of Ayn, finally reach their destination and prepare for the live broadcast. They contact Pjölk, who happily commands them to begin the transmission, then he turns off his tele-o-visor and sits down in front of his typewriter to create the headline article for tomorrow's issue of his tabloid. He fabricates an entire story based on how he is distressed for being responsible for killing the nerd viewers, and where he makes a statement saying that there should be a law banning tele-o-vision forever. Not yet aware of the danger they are putting themselves in, Alalia and Fratt start broadcasting and begin their quest through the lair, following Ayn of Raiká.

On seeing Echsenfriedl, Ayn gets turned into stone: Echsenfriedl is a basilisk. Hiding behind a corner and out of view, Echsenfriedl tells Alalia and Fratt about his life. By dating the Comtesse, he upset his greedy partner Pjölk. Pjölk's sinister plan was to murder all the early adopters of tele-o-vision with a single broadcast of Echsenfriedl's deadly eyes. The nerds can hear the audio of this broadcast, and react with repulsion and anger, attacking Pjölk's office. Echsenfriedl hires Alalia and Fratt as his crew to build a new media empire based on his marvelous new technologies. The films ends with Alalia and Fratt live broadcasting a lynch mob of book-burning nerds, who are the fervent supporters of Echsenfriedl's New World Order of technological dominance.

Cast
Sophia Grabner ... as Alalia Grundschober
Lukas Tagwerker ... as Fratt Aigner
Martin Auer ... as Thurnher von Pjölk
Roland Gratzer ... as Postal Officer Böllerbauer
Evelyn Fürlinger ... as Postal Officer Wottl
Jeff Ricketts ... as Chairman of Farmers' Association
Eva-Christina Binder ... as Philine-Codec Comtesse de Cybersdorf 
David Dempsey ... as Heinz Rand of Raiká
Harald Homolka-List ... as Chief Auctioneer of Raiká 
Conny Lee ... as Ayn of Raiká
Joe Baumgartner ... as the voice of Echsenfriedl

Production

Writing
The basic script, although many scenes were improvised, was written by Johannes Grenzfurthner and Roland Gratzer in a couple of days in November 2013, based on their theatre performance Campaign (Volkstheater, 2006). Some of the ideas were brainstormed at a coffee shop in Vienna with the entire production crew. The film contains dialogues in English, German, a variety of slangs, dialects, accents, and fictitious languages. Subtitles are an integral part of the story.

Financing
The film was commissioned by Austrian broadcasting station ORF III as part of the series "Artist-in-Residence" for a budget of approximately 5000 EUR. It can therefore be considered microfilmmaking or guerrilla filmmaking.monochrom also used an embedded prank to raise money. The movie contains a text insert similar to watermarks used in festival viewing copies. The text insert asks the viewer to report the film as copyright infringement by calling a premium-rate phone number (1.09 EUR/minute). The film aired on Austrian national television in March 2014. Grenzfurthner co-financed the film with proceeds from the premium-rate number. According to Telepolis he calls this new strategy 'crowdratting.'

Filming

Principal photography commenced on December 2, 2013, and ended January 19, 2014, but only a total of 5 days of principal photography. That left around 5 weeks for post-production and editing.

Music
Due to the fast production process and the financial limitations, no film score was composed for "Die Gstettensaga: The Rise of Echsenfriedl". Grenzfurthner instead uses an assortment of 8bit, synth pop and electronica tracks. Grenzfurthner chose songs with a specific retro quality because "they may sound old-school to us, but not in the world of the Gstettensaga, where all retro electronic music is still impossible and futuristic."The film features music by Symbion Project (Kasson Crooker), Max Beseda, Yakov, Robot City, Robert Glashüttner, Christoph Burstup Weiss, Krach der Roboter, BLEO and Starpause, Stefan Franke, Leigh Howells.

Distribution

The film first aired on March 10, 2014, in Austria on ORF III.It screens at film festivals and conventions like Gen Con 2014, Fright Night Film Fest 2014, Hackers on Planet Earth 2014, Roswell Filmfest and Cosmicon 2014, PhutureCon 2014, NYC Independent Film Festival, the International Filmmaker Festival of World Cinema 2015 (London).The film was released online on December 25, 2015.

Reception

Critical response

Amy R. Handler of Film Threat gave the film 5 (of 5) stars: "Grenzfurthner's outspoken, swiftly flying little flick is the must-see indie of 2014, as far as I'm concerned. Everyone, be they intellectuals, political-types, or simply those that love great blackly comic, sensual horror, will fall madly in love with 'Die Gstettensaga: The Rise of Echsenfriedl'. See it, as soon as possible, and I promise you'll never be bored at the movies again." Net culture magazine Furtherfield calls it a "hackploitation art house film" that reimagines "the makerspace as grindhouse", a "retro-futuristic post-cyberpunk adventure in the tradition of cinema grotesque". Gstettensaga's "fascinating cinematic pastiche is more than just a firework of rhizomatic intertextuality, a symptom of the depthlessness of postmodern aesthetics or excessive enthusiasm for experimentation in the field of form. In their infamous 1972 book Anti-Oedipus, Gilles Deleuze and Félix Guattari have identified the technique of bricolage as the characteristic mode of production under 'schizophrenic' capitalism, a facet triumphantly magnified by the filmmakers." Hacker magazine 2600: The Hacker Quarterly interprets the film as a call to class consciousness for hackers: "Setting the film in the future forces hackers to confront a choice: Will we let ourselves and our ingenuity be recuperated by all-consuming market forces? Or will we come together - as is our potential - as the class that ends capitalism's conquest to secure all means of production?" Pop culture theorist Stefan Tiron comments that he is "overenthusiastic about Gstettensaga - because it distracts the Hollywood canon, because it is such a genre bender, a satiric H bomb, a horror movie and ex-auction house vaudeville going for the unexpected dialectical turns of current history, and leading us into the untrodden and definitely outrageous wastelands that could be populated by the likes of Surf Nazis Must Die, Escape from New York, Steel Dawn or America 3000." Jason Scott Sadofsky calls it "the best kind of low-budget filmmaking", it is like "watching an absurdist play by Beckett, if Beckett decided to work on the Mad Max franchise." V. Vale was "struck by the beautiful imagery and sound, mythological plot dimensions" and Richard Kadrey calls it a "mad post-collapse satire of information culture and tech fetishism, in a weird sort of melding of Stalker, Network, and The Bed-Sitting Room." Political scholar Sebastian Vetter interprets the satirical dimension of the plot: "The old world has been reduced to ashes by the earlier beacons of hope (China stands for Maoism and Google for alternative culture). All that remains are stretches of land governed by idiocy and dialects. As Marxists, the people from Monochrom know that only the revolution can free us from capitalism. And yet the revolution is no more alive than unicorns are." Film critic Bonni Rambatan says that the film "forces us to think deeper about the fact that much of today's romanticized revolutions often go eerily hand in hand with the development of digital capitalism. Few films today, if any, manage to do such a feat." German online magazine Telepolis praised the eclectic, multi-layered humor.The film has a fan following in the hacker and tech community.

Awards 

The film won Best Foreign Horror Feature at the 2014 Indie Gathering International Film Festival, won Best Hacker Feature at the 2014 PhutureCon Festival, won Best Foreign Cult Movie at the 2014 Fright Night Film Fest and won Best Narrative Feature at the Maker Film Festival. It was nominated for Best Feature at Colortape International Film Festival and Best Foreign Language Feature Film, Best Director of a Foreign Language Film and Best Soundtrack at the 2015 International Filmmaker Festival of World Cinema (London). Microfilmmaker Magazine awarded the movie an Award of Superiority (9.5/10). The Indie Fest awarded the movie an Award of Merit. The 2015 'DIY Film Festival' in Los Angeles awarded the film a 'honorable mention'.

See also
 Apocalyptic and post-apocalyptic fiction

References

External links

Official homepage
Film online on Vimeo

2014 television films
2014 films
2010s science fiction comedy films
2010s fantasy comedy films
2014 independent films
Absurdist fiction
Austrian comedy films
Austrian satirical films
Austrian independent films
Austrian television films
Cyberpunk films
Dystopian films
Films about nuclear war and weapons
Films about technological impact
Films set in Austria
2010s German-language films
German-language television shows
Monochrom
Post-apocalyptic films
Films directed by Johannes Grenzfurthner
2010s English-language films
2014 multilingual films
Austrian multilingual films